Loomis Fall is an American songwriter, multi-instrumentalist musician, actor and stunt performer who has performed with several rock and punk bands, most notably with Wax, an early-1990s California pop-punk band, which was compared to the likes of the Ramones and the Pixies. Fall has performed as a cast member in the Jackass and Wildboyz television shows and movies. He has also had gallery shows in Los Angeles for his paintings.

Life and career
Fall appeared in the films Jackass: The Movie, Jackass Number Two, Jackass 2.5, Jackass 3D, and Jackass 3.5. He was a recurring cast member on the Jackass and Wildboyz (season 4) TV series.

Fall has worked on a range of musical projects with a variety of rock music veterans. He played lap steel guitar on Roger Alan Wade's All Likkered Up (2005) record. He has also released two CDs of music with his self-titled dark rock/punk band Loomis. On his record Cigarette (1997)/(2006), he played all guitars, drums, vocals, and lap steel. His second record, Black Black (2009), also features Greg Hetson on guitars (Circle Jerks and Bad Religion), Tommy Stinson on bass (The Replacements and Guns N' Roses), and Josh Freese on drums (Vandals, Devo, and Nine Inch Nails).

Fall has played drums with fellow Jackass and Wildboyz castmate Chris Pontius in Pontius' band Scream for Me. The band did an extended tour in Ireland. Fall appeared on The Podge and Rodge Show on RTÉ (Ireland National Television) in 2007. He also played with the band at their appearance on the Jackassworld.com: 24 Hour Takeover on MTV in 2008.

Fall appeared as a cartoon character on MTV2's animated comedy Where My Dogs At? (featuring characters voiced by Jeffrey Ross and Tracy Morgan) in an episode titled "Woofie Loves Snoop" (2006).

Fall contributed background music to the Wildboyz TV series (2003–2006) on MTV, and wrote and played background music for the film Ultimate Predator (2006). He has also contributed music as a writer on a variety of TV and film projects, including the films, Bio-Dome, and Mallrats, for which he penned the title song.

Fall performed with Manny Puig's live "Snakes in the Club" show—featuring a collection of live snakes—which toured Florida in 2008.

Fall is a registered baseball umpire and officiated the 2007 Little League Baseball final in Williamsport.

Fall made guest appearances, along with fellow Jackass stars Bam Margera and Ryan Dunn, in the Gumball 3000, which took them to Korea and China (2008). He returned again for the Gumball 3000 U.S. Rally Coast to Coast TV series (2009).

Fall appeared as a cartoon character in a special edition Marvel comic book issue "The Saturday Morning Comic" released in 1996. The issue featured the Ramones, the Violent Femmes and Wax.

Fall appeared in five music videos while a member of Wax, four of which were directed by Spike Jonze. In addition to the "man on fire" video for "California" (1995), Jonze also directed Wax videos for "Hush" (1992) (one of Jonze's first music videos), "Who Is Next" (1995), and a video for Wax's rendition of The Ren and Stimpy Shows "Happy Happy Joy Joy" (1995) which appeared on the Saturday Morning: Cartoons' Greatest Hits compilation CD and video. Fall also appeared in an alternate video for the song "Who Is Next" (1994) which featured members of the band Rancid. Additionally, he was in an episode of Beavis and Butt-Head, when the two MTV animated characters watch Wax's video for "California" and it sends Beavis into a shaking and mumbling trance due to his obsession with fire. The video was banned from daytime airplay by MTV in 1995.

Before being in the band Wax (in the late 80s-early 90s), Loomis was the drummer for goth L.A. band Screams for Tina (Cleopatra Records) playing drums on some of their early recordings and live shows.

Fall played bandolin and guitar for skateboarder Mark Gonzales in what they called the Mark Gonzales 5 band on a song which was featured in a Real skateboard video (1997).

In February 2000, in a pre-Jackass stunt, Fall and Chris Pontius joined forces for Big Brother skateboard magazine and donned pink and blue pj's and used skateboard trucks as slides for dobros and lap steel guitars. The goal was a humorous durability test to see if the trucks would hold up during the mayhem.

While filming Jackass 3D, Fall suffered a compound fracture of his clavicle when he landed on it during a stunt involving a jet engine and an umbrella.

In 2013, Fall & Greg Hetson (from the Circle Jerks & Bad Religion) wrote all the songs together for their band Creatures In Habit. All vocals, live drums, steel guitar were played by Fall. All guitars, bass, keyboard, were played by Hetson. They released a limited, scarce to find vinyl pressing of only 150. In 2021, on Halloween night, their band Creatures In Habit released Whips? Just Hits for digital downloading.

Filmography

Films

Television

Music videos
 Flogging Molly (2000)
 Pete Yorn – "Life on a Chain" (2001)
 Pete Yorn – "Strange Condition" (2002)
 Andrew WK – Backyard BBQ Party MTV (cameo, 2002)
 Andrew WK – "We Want Fun" (2002)
 Roger Alan Wade – "If You're Gonna Be Dumb, You Got to Be Tough" (2002)
 Turbonegro – "Sell Your Body (to the Night)" (cameo, 2003)
 Roger Alan Wade – "D.R.U.N.K" (2008)
 Weezer – "Memories" (2010)

References

External links

Living people
1976 births
Wax (American band) members
American punk rock drummers
20th-century American drummers
American male drummers
21st-century American drummers
20th-century American male musicians
21st-century American male musicians
American stunt performers
Jackass (TV series)